Charles Randall Gallett (January 6, 1833 – December 27, 1911) was a member of the Wisconsin State Assembly.

Biography
Gallett was born on January 6, 1833, in Benton, New York. He relocated to Wisconsin in 1854. He was a merchant by trade. In 1865, Gallett married Lydia Viola Wells. They had seven children. Gallett died of heart failure in San Francisco in 1911.

Political career
Gallett was a member of the Assembly in 1879. In addition, he was an alderman and mayor of Portage, Wisconsin. He was a Republican.

References

People from Portage, Wisconsin
Republican Party members of the Wisconsin State Assembly
Mayors of places in Wisconsin
Wisconsin city council members
American merchants
1833 births
1911 deaths
19th-century American politicians
19th-century American businesspeople